Omar Davies (born 28 May 1947) is a Jamaican former politician and academic. A member of the People's National Party (PNP), Davies was Minister of Finance from 1993 to 2007.

Early life
Davis was born in Four Paths, Clarendon, Jamaica on 28 May 1947. He attended Glenmuir High School, the University of the West Indies in Mona, St. Andrews. In 1973, he graduated from Northwestern University in Illinois, United States with a Doctorate in Economics.

Career
Prior to joining politics, Davies was an academic. From 1973 to 1975, he was an assistant professor at Stanford University. From 1981 to 1989, he was Senior Lecturer at the economics department of the University of the West Indies as well as Senior Research Fellow at the Institute of Social and Economic Research. From 1989 to 1993, Davies was the director-general of the Planning Institute of Jamaica, while also working at the Ministry of Finance and Planning as Special Adviser to the minister. He represented Jamaica as a negotiator at the International Monetary Fund, the World Bank, and the Inter-American Development Bank.

Davies was elected to parliament representing South St. Andrew. From April 1993 to August 1993, he worked at the Office of the Prime Minister with an interest in Planning, Development and Project Implementation. From August 1993 to November 1993, he was Minister without Portfolio in the Ministry of Finance. In December 1993, Davies became Minister of Finance and Planning, a position he held till 2007. He was appointed Minister of Transport in January 2012. Davies retired from politics on 29 June 2017.

Public opinion
Wesly Morris, writing for The Gleaner, was critical of Davies' tenure as finance minister, blaming him for the "breakdown in the Jamaican economy in the 1990s". Garfield Higgins of the Jamaica Observer called Davies "the worst financial minister since political independence", adding that his retirement "will mark the end of an era which thousands of Jamaicans will unhappily remember for many years to come."

References

1947 births
Living people
Finance ministers of Jamaica
Government ministers of Jamaica
Members of the House of Representatives of Jamaica
People's National Party (Jamaica) politicians
University of the West Indies academics
Members of the 13th Parliament of Jamaica